Hallstein Bøgseth (born 8 July 1954) is a former Norwegian nordic combined skier. He represented Namdalseid I.L. in Namdalseid. He won four 3 x 10 km team event medals at the FIS Nordic World Ski Championships with one gold (1984) and three silvers (1982, 1985, and 1987) and finished 8th in the individual event in 1985.

Bøgseth's lone individual victory came at the 1986 Holmenkollen ski festival. He finished 11th in the individual event at the 1984 Winter Olympics in Sarajevo.

References

Holmenkollen winners since 1892 - click Vinnere for downloadable pdf file 

1954 births
Nordic combined skiers at the 1980 Winter Olympics
Nordic combined skiers at the 1984 Winter Olympics
Nordic combined skiers at the 1988 Winter Olympics
Holmenkollen Ski Festival winners
Living people
Norwegian male Nordic combined skiers
Olympic Nordic combined skiers of Norway
FIS Nordic World Ski Championships medalists in Nordic combined
20th-century Norwegian people